Diplodia seriata is an anamorphic fungus species in the genus Diplodia. It is a cause of bot canker of grapevine in Mexico.

References

External links
 Index Fungorum
 

Botryosphaeriaceae
Fungi described in 1842
Fungal plant pathogens and diseases
Grapevine trunk diseases